Dr. V. Mohini Giri (born 1938) is an Indian Community service worker and activist, who has been Chairperson of the Guild of Service, a New Delhibased social service organization. Established in 1979, it provides advocacy for women's and children's rights for education, employment, and financial security. She founded War Widows Association, New Delhi in 1972. She has also remained Chairperson of the National Commission for Women (19951998).

In 2007, she was awarded the Padma Bhushan, India's third highest civilian honour, given by Government of India.

Early life and background
Born in Lucknow to scholar Dr. V. S. Ram, she graduated from Lucknow University, followed by post graduation in Ancient Indian history from University of Delhi, and a doctorate from G.B. Pant University.

Giri is the daughter-in-law of V. V. Giri, former President of India.

Career
Giri started her career as an academic and established the women's studies department at Lucknow University. Giri has been the Founder President of the War Widows Association which was formed in 1972 after the Indo-Pakistani War of 1971
 and in 2000 became the  Founder Trustee of the Women’s Initiative for Peace in South Asia.

She is also a board member of The Hunger Project, a New York-based international charity.

Bibliography
 V. Mohini Giri (2006). Deprived Devis: Women’s Unequal Status in Society. Gyan Publishing House, New Delhi.
 V. Mohini Giri; Meera Khanna (2021). Mantras For Positive Ageing. Pippa Rann Books and Media, UK.

References

1938 births
Living people
Social workers
Indian women activists
Writers from Lucknow
Delhi University alumni
Widowhood in India
Indian women's rights activists
Indian social sciences writers
Women's studies academics
University of Lucknow alumni
Academic staff of the University of Lucknow
Recipients of the Padma Bhushan in social work
Indian National Congress politicians from Uttar Pradesh
Women in Uttar Pradesh politics
Women writers from Uttar Pradesh
Activists from Uttar Pradesh
20th-century Indian educational theorists
20th-century Indian women writers
20th-century Indian non-fiction writers
Scholars from Lucknow
21st-century Indian women writers
21st-century Indian non-fiction writers
Women educators from Uttar Pradesh
Educators from Uttar Pradesh
Social workers from Uttar Pradesh
20th-century women educators